Wrighten is a surname. Notable people with the surname include:

Charlotte Wrighten Placide (1776–1823), American actress and opera singer
James Wrighten (1745–1793), English actor
Mary Ann Wrighten (1751–1796), English singer, actress, and composer

See also
Wright